Muskeg River Mine (MRM) Cogeneration Station is a natural gas-fired station owned by Heartland Generation, located 75 km north of Fort McMurray and is part of the Albian Sands Project.

Description 

The MRM Cogeneration Station consists of:
 2 - GE 7EA gas-fired turbine and generator sets with low nitrous oxide burners
 2 - Heat recovery steam generators
 2 - Standby auxiliary gas-fired boilers.

References

External links 
 SaskPower Station Description

Natural gas-fired power stations in Alberta
ATCO
SaskPower
Regional Municipality of Wood Buffalo